Annabell Fuller (born 2002) is an English amateur golfer. She won the 2020 English Women's Open Amateur Stroke Play Championship. She played in the 2018 and 2021 Curtis Cup.

Golf career
In August 2020, Fuller won the English Women's Open Amateur Stroke Play Championship at Burnham and Berrow Golf Club, finishing three strokes ahead of her nearest challenger. The following week she reached the final of the Womens Amateur Championship, losing by 1 hole to Aline Krauter.

Fuller has represented Great Britain and Ireland in the 2018 Curtis Cup and the 2019 Vagliano Trophy and has represented Europe in the Patsy Hankins Trophy, the Junior Ryder Cup and the Junior Solheim Cup.

Since 2020, Fuller has played for the Florida Gators.

Amateur wins
2016 Sir Henry Cooper Junior Masters
2017 English Under 16 Girls' Championship, Telegraph Vitality Junior Golf Championship
2019 Major Champions Invitational
2020 English Women's Open Amateur Stroke Play Championship
2021 Florida Gators Invitational

Source:

Team appearances
Amateur
Patsy Hankins Trophy (representing Europe): 2018
Curtis Cup (representing Great Britain & Ireland): 2018, 2021, 2022
European Ladies' Team Championship (representing England): 2018, 2019, 2021 (winners), 2022 (winners)
Junior Ryder Cup (representing Europe): 2018
Vagliano Trophy (representing Great Britain and Ireland): 2019
Junior Solheim Cup (representing Europe): 2019

References

English female golfers
Amateur golfers
Florida Gators women's golfers
2002 births
Living people